Red Yellow Sun is the fourth studio album released by American singer-songwriter Sarah Fimm.

Critical reception
Trey Spencer of Sputnikmusic awarded the album four stars, calling "it simply a stunning and emotionally warm album that has stripped the electronic elements in favor of a more organic sound."

Track listing
All tracks written by David Baron/Sarah Fimm. The album's track listing can be obtained from Allmusic.

References

External links
 

2009 albums
Sarah Fimm albums